Dawson is a lunar impact crater that lies on the southern hemisphere on the far side of the Moon. It lies across a crater triplet: the southeast rim is intruding into the crater Alekhin; the northwest rim also intrudes into the larger satellite crater Dawson V, and the northeast rim is attached to the comparably sized Dawson D. To the south of this formation is the large crater Zeeman. West of Dawson is the crater Crommelin, and to the north lies Fizeau.

Dawson is a relatively young formation that lies in the midst of a field of ancient, heavily eroded craters. The outer rim is nearly circular, but slightly distorted due to the craters it overlaps. The western rim is slightly flattened where it overlaps Dawson V. The crater formation shows little appearance of wear, with only a small craterlet across the northwest rim and another inside the northeast rim. The interior is irregular with some slight terraces along parts of the inner wall.

Satellite craters 

By convention these features are identified on lunar maps by placing the letter on the side of the crater midpoint that is closest to Dawson.

References 

 
 
 
 
 
 
 
 
 
 
 
 

Impact craters on the Moon